Idus Lawrence Shields (born July 1, 1894, in Thomson, McDuffie County, Georgia, died October 9, 1976, in Columbus, Georgia) was an American politician.

Shields was the son of Wiley Octavious Shields (1847–1916) and Georgia Anna Shields (1854–1911) and grew up with several siblings. In May 1911 he graduated from Thomson High School. After the United States entered World War I, Shields began his service in the Special Training Detachment at the University of Georgia in Athens in April 1918. In July 1918 he was transferred to Camp Meade, Maryland, and in the same month from Philadelphia, Pennsylvania via Romsey and Southampton in England, shipped to Le Havre in France. There he served as a private in Company E of the 304th Ammunition Train and fought in the Meuse-Argonne offensive.

From the 1920s he was active in the theater business in Columbus, Georgia. From 1945 to 1949 and again from 1966, he was a Democrat in the Georgia House of Representatives representing Muscogee County.

From 1952 he was a member of the Columbus City Commission. In the same year, he held the office of mayor pro tempore under Mayor B.F. Register. In 1953, Shields served a year as the mayor of Columbus.

Shields was a Baptist, a Freemason, and a member of the American Legion. He had a daughter from his divorce in 1928. In 1930 he married again. From this marriage two daughters were born. Shield died on October 9, 1976, at the age of 82 in St. Francis Hospital in Columbus as a result of acute coronary obstruction. On October 11, he was on the Park Hill Cemetery buried in Columbus.

References

Members of the Georgia House of Representatives
1894 births
1976 deaths
Mayors of Columbus, Georgia